William Roger Fahey (FAY-hee) (born June 14, 1950) is a former catcher in professional baseball who played for the Washington Senators / Texas Rangers (–, –), San Diego Padres (–) and Detroit Tigers (–). Fahey batted left-handed and threw right-handed. His son, Brandon, is an infielder who played with the Baltimore Orioles.

Biography
Bill Fahey played eleven seasons in the Major Leagues as a backup catcher. He shared duties with Jim Sundberg in Texas, with Gene Tenace for San Diego and Lance Parrish in Detroit. The next season, he posted career-highs in games (93), runs (18), hits (62) and RBI (22). 
Fahey was a .241 hitter with seven home runs and 83 RBI in 383 games.

After his playing career ended, Fahey managed in the Detroit farm system, and was a Major League coach for the Tigers (1983) and San Francisco Giants (1986–91), serving as an aide to Roger Craig when Craig was the Tigers' pitching coach and then the Giants' manager.

See also

List of second-generation Major League Baseball players

External links

Baseball Almanac
Bill Fahey - Baseballbiography.com

1950 births
Living people
Baseball players from Detroit
Burlington Senators players
Denver Bears players
Detroit Tigers players
Evansville Triplets players
Major League Baseball catchers
Major League Baseball third base coaches
Pittsfield Senators players
San Diego Padres players
San Francisco Giants coaches
Spokane Indians players
Texas Rangers players
Tucson Toros players
Washington Senators (1961–1971) players